Dizzy Gillespie and the Double Six of Paris is a 1963 studio album collaboration between Dizzy Gillespie and Les Double Six, also known as the Double Six of Paris, a French vocal group who sings in vocalese to songs associated with Dizzy Gillespie. Gillespie, pianist Bud Powell, and a rhythm section accompany; two of the songs feature his quintet, with James Moody.  It was reissued on CD in 1989.

Track listing
 "Emanon" (Gillespie, Shaw)  3:44  
 "Anthropology" (Gillespie, Parker)  2:45  
 "Tin Tin Deo"  (Fuller, Pozo)  4:15  
 "One Bass Hit"  (Brown, Fuller, Gillespie)  3:26  
 "Two Bass Hit"  (Gillespie, Lewis)  3:31  
 "Groovin' High"  (Gillespie, Paparelli)  2:27  
 "Ooh-Shoo-Be-Doo-Bee"  (Carroll, Gillespie, Graham)  3:04  
 "Hot House"  (Dameron)  3:01  
 "Con Alma"  (Gillespie)  3:35  
 "Blue 'n' Boogie"  (Gillespie, Paparelli)  3:08  
 "The Champ"  (Gillespie)  3:06  
 "Ow!"  (Gillespie)  2:43

Personnel
 Kenny Barron – piano  
 Jean-Claude Briodin – vocals  
 Kenny Clarke – drums  
 Rudy Collins – drums  
 Dizzy Gillespie – trumpet  
 Christiane Legrand – vocals  
 Eddy Louiss – vocals  
 Pierre Michelot – bass  
 James Moody – alto saxophone  
 Mimi Perrin – vocals  
 Bud Powell – piano  
 Lalo Schifrin – arranger  
 Bob Smart – vocals  
 Ward Swingle – vocals  
 Chris White – bass

References 

1963 albums
Dizzy Gillespie albums
Philips Records albums
Les Double Six albums
Albums arranged by Lalo Schifrin
Collaborative albums